Jules Alphonse Eugène Itier (1802–77) French customs inspector and amateur daguerreotypist. Between 1842 and 1843 he traveled to Senegal, Guadeloupe and India, where he took a number of early daguerreotypes.

In December 1843, Itier was sent to accompany Théodore de Lagrené on his journey to China, where he been dispatched by Louis Philippe to conclude a commercial treaty. In China, Itier documented the conclusion of the Treaty of Whampoa and took a number of daguerreotypes of Chinese people and scenery in the Guangdong region. Although the daguerreotype reportedly reached China in the later stages of the First Opium War, Itier's daguerreotypes are the earliest preserved photographs of China. Upon his return to France, Itier wrote an extensive travelogue of his journey to China.

References
Itier, Jules. Journal d'un voyage en Chine en 1843, 1844, 1845, 1846. 3 vols. Paris: Chez Dauvin et Fontaine, 1848.

External links
    
Article from China Photography Museum (in Chinese)
Daguerreotypes by Jules Itier (in French)
Biography from the Getty

1802 births
1877 deaths
Pioneers of photography
19th-century French photographers
Photography in China